Subirats is a surname. Notable people with the surname include:

Agustí Querol Subirats (1860–1909), Spanish sculptor
Albert Subirats (born 1986), Venezuelan swimmer
Javier Subirats (born 1957), Spanish footballer
Joan Subirats (born 1951), Spanish political scientist